Plagiozopelma is a genus of flies in the family Dolichopodidae.

Species

 Plagiozopelma albidum (Becker, 1922)
 Plagiozopelma albipatellatum (Parent, 1935)
 Plagiozopelma allectans (Walker, 1857)
 Plagiozopelma alliciens (Walker, 1857)
 Plagiozopelma alutiferum (Parent, 1934)
 Plagiozopelma amplipenne (Parent, 1941)
 Plagiozopelma angulitarse (Parent, 1933)
 Plagiozopelma angustifacies (Becker, 1922)
 Plagiozopelma annotatum (Becker, 1922)
 Plagiozopelma anuliseta (Enderlein, 1912)
 Plagiozopelma apicatum (Becker, 1922)
 Plagiozopelma appendiculatum (Bigot, 1890)
 Plagiozopelma arctifacies (Parent, 1935)
 Plagiozopelma argentifrons (Parent, 1935)
 Plagiozopelma ashbyi Bickel, 1994
 Plagiozopelma atropurpureum (Parent, 1939)
 Plagiozopelma aurifrons Bickel, 1994
 Plagiozopelma bellicum Bickel, 2005
 Plagiozopelma bequaerti (Curran, 1926)
 Plagiozopelma biseta Zhu, Masunaga & Yang, 2007
 Plagiozopelma brevarista Zhu & Yang, 2011
 Plagiozopelma brunnipenne (Becker, 1922)
 Plagiozopelma caeleste (Walker, 1849)
 Plagiozopelma capilliferum (Parent, 1933)
 Plagiozopelma collarti (Curran, 1927)
 Plagiozopelma congruens (Becker, 1922)
 Plagiozopelma conjectum (Parent, 1933)
 Plagiozopelma cordatum (De Meijere, 1914)
 Plagiozopelma cynicum (Parent, 1935)
 Plagiozopelma daveyi (Parent, 1939)
 Plagiozopelma defuense Yang, Grootaert & Song, 2002
 Plagiozopelma devoense Bickel, 2005
 Plagiozopelma discophorum (Frey, 1924)
 Plagiozopelma du (Curran, 1929)
 Plagiozopelma duplicatum (Becker, 1922)
 Plagiozopelma efatense Bickel, 2005
 Plagiozopelma elongatum (Becker, 1922)
 Plagiozopelma excisum (Becker, 1922)
 Plagiozopelma extractum (Becker, 1922)
 Plagiozopelma faciatum (Becker, 1922)
 Plagiozopelma flavicorne (Wiedemann, 1830)
 Plagiozopelma flavidum Zhu, Masunaga & Yang, 2007
 Plagiozopelma flavipodex (Becker, 1922)
 Plagiozopelma foliatum (Becker, 1922)
 Plagiozopelma fornatica Tang, Zhu & Yang, 2019
 Plagiozopelma grahami (Parent, 1939)
 Plagiozopelma grandiseta (Parent, 1932)
 Plagiozopelma grossum (Becker, 1922)
 Plagiozopelma impunctatum (Parent, 1934)
 Plagiozopelma indentatum (Parent, 1934)
 Plagiozopelma infirme (Becker, 1922)
 Plagiozopelma inops (Parent, 1929)
 Plagiozopelma inscriptum (Becker, 1922)
 Plagiozopelma kandyense (Hollis, 1964)
 Plagiozopelma laffooni Bickel, 2005
 Plagiozopelma latemarginatum (Parent, 1934)
 Plagiozopelma lichtwardti (Enderlein, 1912)
 Plagiozopelma limbatifrons (De Meijere, 1914)
 Plagiozopelma luchunanum Yang & Saigusa, 2001
 Plagiozopelma magniflavum Bickel & Wei, 1996
 Plagiozopelma medivittatum Bickel & Wei, 1996
 Plagiozopelma mezamense Grichanov, 2021
 Plagiozopelma micantifrons (Speiser, 1910)
 Plagiozopelma mimans (Parent, 1934)
 Plagiozopelma mirandum (Becker, 1922)
 Plagiozopelma mouldsorum Bickel, 1994
 Plagiozopelma nalense (Curran, 1926)
 Plagiozopelma negotiosum (Parent, 1935)
 Plagiozopelma nemocerum (Van der Wulp, 1895)
 Plagiozopelma nigricoxatum (Enderlein, 1912)
 Plagiozopelma niveoapicale (Frey, 1924)
 Plagiozopelma njalense (Parent, 1934)
 Plagiozopelma nonnitens (Parent, 1937)
 Plagiozopelma oculatum (Becker, 1922)
 Plagiozopelma ovale (Becker, 1922)
 Plagiozopelma pallidicorne (Curran, 1927)
 Plagiozopelma parapunctinerve (Hollis, 1964)
 Plagiozopelma petulans (Becker, 1922)
 Plagiozopelma piliseta (Parent, 1936)
 Plagiozopelma placidum Bickel, 1994
 Plagiozopelma principale (Becker, 1922)
 Plagiozopelma pubescens Yang, 1999
 Plagiozopelma punctiforme (Becker, 1922)
 Plagiozopelma punctinerve (Parent, 1935)
 Plagiozopelma ramiseta (Parent, 1939)
 Plagiozopelma rhopaloceras (De Meijere, 1914)
 Plagiozopelma santense Bickel, 2005
 Plagiozopelma satoi Yang, 1995
 Plagiozopelma shentorea (Hollis, 1964)
 Plagiozopelma spinicaudum Bickel, 2005
 Plagiozopelma strenuum (Parent, 1935)
 Plagiozopelma subpatellatum (Van der Wulp, 1895)
 Plagiozopelma subrectum (Walker, 1864)
 Plagiozopelma sukapisu Bickel, 2005
 Plagiozopelma terminiferum (Walker, 1858)
 Plagiozopelma tokotaai Bickel, 2005
 Plagiozopelma trifurcatum Yang, Grootaert & Song, 2002
 Plagiozopelma trilobata Tang, Zhu & Yang, 2019
 Plagiozopelma tritiseta (Parent, 1929)
 Plagiozopelma vagator (Becker, 1923)
 Plagiozopelma vitiense Bickel, 2005
 Plagiozopelma xanthocyaneum (Parent, 1934)
 Plagiozopelma xishuangbannanum Yang, Grootaert & Song, 2002

References

Sciapodinae
Dolichopodidae genera
Diptera of Australasia
Diptera of Asia
Taxa named by Günther Enderlein